Rolf Rendtorff (10 May 1925 – 1 April 2014) was Emeritus Professor of Old Testament at the University of Heidelberg. He has written frequently on the Jewish scriptures and was notable chiefly for his contribution to the debate over the origins of the Pentateuch (the first five books of the Old Testament).

Biography 
Rendtorff was born at Preetz, Holstein, Germany. He studied theology from 1945 to 1950 at the universities of Kiel, Göttingen and Heidelberg. He undertook his doctoral studies under Gerhard von Rad, 1950–53. He died on 1 April 2014.

Major achievements 
Rendtorff has published many works on Old Testament subjects, but was notable chiefly for his 1977 book, "Das überlieferungsgeschichtliche Problem des Pentateuch" (The Problem of the Transmission of the Pentateuch).  The book was a study of the question of Pentateuchal origins (the question of how the first five books of the bible – Genesis, Exodus, Leviticus, Book of Numbers and Deuteronomy – came to be written), and appeared at the same time as two other important books, John Van Seters' Abraham in History and Tradition (1975), and Hans Heinrich Schmid's Der sogenannte Jahwist (The So-called Yahwist) (1976). The three studies, appearing almost together, inaugurated a heated discussion in scholarly circles on the validity of the then-dominant consensus on Pentateuchal origins, the Documentary Hypothesis.

Notes 

1925 births
2014 deaths
People from Preetz
20th-century German Protestant theologians
German biblical scholars
Old Testament scholars
University of Kiel alumni
University of Göttingen alumni
Heidelberg University alumni
Academic staff of Heidelberg University
German male non-fiction writers